Gunpowder is a 1985 Soviet drama film directed by Viktor Aristov.

Plot 
In the center of the plot is a detachment that managed to deliver gunpowder from Kronstadt to Leningrad, despite an attack by artillery and aircraft.

Cast 
 Yury Belyayev as Nikolay Nikonov (as Yuriy Belyaev)
 Svetlana Bragarnik
 Lyubov Kalyuzhnaya
 Vadim Makarovsky	
 Nozheri Chonishvili
 Vladimir Varentsov		
 Konstantin Sarynin
 Dzheikhun Kerimov
 Nina Mazaeva
 Viktor Sukhorukov

References

External links 
 

1985 films
1980s Russian-language films
Soviet drama films
1985 drama films